Abdolreza Hashemzaei is an Iranian reformist politician who is currently a member of the Parliament of Iran representing Tehran, Rey, Shemiranat and Eslamshahr electoral district. He formerly represented Ferdos and Tabas County.

Career 
Hashemzaei was a senior manager in the Minister of Power and advisor to Minister of Industries.

Electoral history

References

1944 births
Living people
People from Nain, Iran
Executives of Construction Party politicians
Members of the 2nd Islamic Consultative Assembly
Members of the 10th Islamic Consultative Assembly